Carolyn Julia Owlett (born 8 March 1984) is a British singer and model. She is a member of R&B group The 411.

Career
The 411's first single "On My Knees" with Ghostface Killah went to No. 4 in the UK chart whilst the second single "Dumb" reached No. 3 in the UK Chart. A third single, "Teardrops" and an album Between the Sheets followed but the group disbanded in 2005.

At the end of 2005, Owlett was asked, along with bandmate Suzie Furlonger, to sign a separate deal with Polydor Records.

She was the face of Amplified clothing in 2008, 2009 and 2010 and made an 'Axe' hair care commercial for the US. As a television presenter, her credits include pieces for Current TV. Her 2008 programme Sexy Girls Have It Easy had over 40,000 views in the first month, and by October 2010 had the highest ever online views for the channel. She has written articles for Marie Claire magazine, and is a producer for a Broadcast PR company.

In December 2021 it was announced that The 411 would reform to play at Mighty Hoopla in June 2022. Due to the success of the gig the band have continued touring the UK together

Personal life
Owlett lives in Dalston, East London with her sons, Billy and Cassius. Billy is an actor and became the youngest ever winner of the International Emmy Award for Best Actor in 2020 for Responsible Child.

References

1984 births
Living people
English women pop singers
English female models
The 411 members
British contemporary R&B singers
21st-century English women singers
21st-century English singers
People from Dalston